Blacklist Studio was a group of Taiwanese musicians who came together and released a ground-breaking album in 1989 called Songs of Madness. Reportedly five years in the making, this work came out at a critical juncture in Taiwan's history, two years after the lifting of the decades-long martial law. The album was critical in the formation of the genre known as New Taiwanese Song.

Its members included Wang Ming Hui, Chen Ming Chang, Lin Wei Zhe().

The first album's notes reveal the seriousness with which the group assessed its own role in Taiwan's musical development.  They believed that Taiwanese music ought to reflect the times, that it was important for the new generations to "correctly" see the relationship between the mother tongue and themselves.  Unlike virtually all other previous works, their songs sought to engage post-World War II social changes in a frank, realist way.

The songs' styles cover Taiwanese folk, rap, and rock. One song has a clip of the Republic of China national anthem.  Another samples environmental sounds from the street.  Most of the songs told stories, sometimes through humorous or ironic dialogues between ordinary citizens. Taiwanese is used extensively in many of the songs.

In 1996, the group released their second album, Cradle Songs (Yaolan qu). However, the album was a commercial and critical failure.

The group received the Special Contribution Award during the 30th Golden Melody Awards.

Discography

Songs of Madness (1989) 

The titles below are official ones provided by Rock Records:

 Imperial Taipei
 Mad
 Too Sad to Speak
 Papa's Words
 Dragon Festival Celebration
 Taxi
 A Democracy Bumpkin
 Shin-chuang Street
 Sow a Seed

Cradle Songs (1996)

References

Taiwanese rock music groups
Taiwanese Hokkien-language bands